International Winter Swimming Association (IWSA) is a non-governmental organization registered in Latvia, which is the governing body of mainly the following  winter swimming world events: the Winter Swimming World Championships (WSWC), which is masters championships in the men's and women's age categories (A to J2) and held at two-year intervals and the IWSA World Cup or Winter Swimming Cup, which  consists  of approximately ten  winter season events in different parts of the world. IWSA was founded in 2006 and its founding members were swimmers from Finland, Great Britain, Russia and Slovakia.

Board
The board of the association has four members and is chaired by the President of the IWSA and has two vice-presidents. In particular, the Board manages the selection of venues for events organized by the IWSA in cooperation with the management of the venues where the IWSA events will be organized, for the related financial requirements and for the coordination of the dates of winter swimming events. The basic goal of the activities of the Board and the IWSA is to ensure the safety and health of winter swimmers during winter swimming events.

Rules

At the IWSA event site water is classified into three temperature categories: category A indicates water with  temperature below or equal 2 °C, category B indicates water with a temperature above 2 °C to 5 °C (including) and category C denotes water above 5 °C. This indicates which races can take place: for competitions up to 200 m, category A is also permissible, for endurance swim 450 m  both category B and C are allowed and 1000 m races are held in water of category C. Scoring for ranking in competitions also depends on the water category. Winter Swimming World Championships have detailed rules published on the IWSA website. [4] For the purposes of classification in competitions and registration, competitors have individual IWSA-accounts to manage personal information and are assigned an appropriate IWSA identification number (IWSA-ID) that is used to register swimmers and score them at races. The results of the races, which have taken place since 2015, are published on the IWSA website.

For the realized IWSA-competitions, the best achieved times in each age category are recorded and absolute records on individual men's and women's tracks are also registered. 
IWSA-motto is: "No water is too cold."

Medical requirements for swimmers
For competitions for 450 m and 1000 m, swimmers must meet the requirement to complete the qualifying race on the 200 m track (for competitive swimming for 450 m) resp. 450 m (for competitive swimming at 1000 m) in water up to 5 °C, as evidenced by the AFFIDAVIT declaration form. In addition, the day before these races, there is usually a mandatory health check consisting of measuring the competitor's blood pressure and ECG examination (often with the requirement to have the result of an earlier ECG examination from their place of residence).

For the 10th anniversary of IWSA, official video IWSA - 10 years was issued. And following references concerning WSWC 2020 in Bled  are examples of organization, rules and result of IWSA-event.

See also
 Winter Swimming World Championships

References

External links
 Official website of IWSA
 IWSA on openwaterpedia.org
 Official video IWSA - 10 years

International sports organizations
Swimming organizations
Winter swimming